Marywell is a village in Angus, Scotland, that is north of Arbroath, in the parish of St Vigeans.

References

Sources
Marywell in the Gazetteer for Scotland.

Villages in Angus, Scotland